Lesné is a village and municipality in Michalovce District in the Kosice Region of eastern Slovakia.

History
In historical records the village was first mentioned in 1254.

Geography
The village lies at an altitude of 146 metres and covers an area of 6.815 km². The municipality has a population of about 425 people.

Culture
The village has a public library and a football pitch.

Gallery

References

External links

Villages and municipalities in Michalovce District